Stanislav Kasparovich Echsner,  Stanislav Kasparovič Eksner (May 7 ?/May 19, 1859, Radoszyce, Congress Poland  November 28, 1934, Warsaw) was a Polish-Russian musician, pianist, and activist music educator. He was the founder of the Saratov Music School (now Saratov Regional College of Art) - 1895, and the Saratov Conservatory - 1912.

Biography
From 1875-1878, Echsner studied at the Leipzig Conservatory as a pianist. He then moved to St. Petersburg and graduated from the St. Petersburg Conservatory in 1883 with first prize. From 1883-1921 he lived and worked in Saratov, first as head of music classes of the Imperial Russian Musical Society, and then from 1912-1914 as the first director of the Saratov Conservatory. The  growth of music education in Saratov was largely a result of his work. In addition to the educational and organizational work he put into concerts, he continued to perform as a pianist and later as a conductor. In 1909 he celebrated 25 years of artistic activity in the city. He was awarded the title of Honorary Citizen of Saratov in 1914.

In 1921 Echsner left Russia. He died in Warsaw in 1934 after a long illness, and was buried at the Powazki Cemetery.

Notable students include Apolinary Szeluto.

References 

1859 births
1921 deaths
People from Końskie County
People from Radom Governorate
People who emigrated to escape Bolshevism
19th-century classical pianists
Polish classical musicians
Musicians from the Russian Empire
Polish classical pianists
Male classical pianists
Classical pianists from the Russian Empire
Polish music educators
Russian music educators
Polish expatriates in Germany
Polish emigrants to Russia
People from the Russian Empire of Polish descent
19th-century Polish musicians
19th-century male musicians
Academic staff of Saratov Conservatory